A cream pie is a type of pie filled with a rich custard or pudding.

Cream pie or creampie may also refer to:

Food
Boston cream pie, a cake with a cream filling
Chocolate cream pie, an old name for Boston cream pie
Sugar cream pie, also known as a sugar pie

Other
Creampie (sexual act), a sexual act